Ozyptila perplexa is a crab spider species found in Spain, France and Algeria.

References

External links 

perplexa
Spiders of Europe
Fauna of Algeria
Spiders described in 1875